Spotlight is a Canadian current affairs television program which aired on CBC Television from July to September 1975.

Overview
This interview program featured guests such as separatist Quebec premier René Lévesque, politicians Bob Andras and Philip Givens, conservationist Roderick Haig-Brown and Auditor General Maxwell Henderson.

Scheduling
This half-hour program was broadcast Thursdays at 10:30 p.m. (Eastern time) from 17 July to 4 September 1975.

References

External links
 

CBC Television original programming
1975 Canadian television series debuts
1975 Canadian television series endings
1970s Canadian television news shows